Shakib Khan (শাকিব খান) is a Bangladeshi film actor, producer, occasional singer, film organiser and media personality who works in Bengali films, both in Bangladesh and West Bengal. He made his debut in Ananta Bhalobasha (1999), though it did not lead to widespread fame. He rise to fame after year 2005. After a few years, Khan established himself as one of the most successful actors in Bengali cinema. He is popularly known in the media as "Superstar", "Megastar", "King Khan","Number One" and "King of Dhallywood". Currently he is the highest paid actor in Bangladesh Film Industry.

Shakib Khan has earned numerous accolades in his long career, including 4 National Film Awards, 8 Meril Prothom Alo Awards, 3 Bachsas Awards and 4 CJFB Performance Awards. He won the National Film Awards for Best Actor four times for the films 2010's Bhalobaslei Ghor Bandha Jay Na, 2012's Khodar Pore Ma, 2015's Aro Bhalobashbo Tomay and 2017's Swatta.

His other notable films are drama film Shuva (2006), romantic Amar Praner Swami (2007), Priya Amar Priya (2008) and Bolbo Kotha Bashor Ghore (2009), romantic-comedy Adorer Jamai (2011), action-romantic Don Number One (2012), romantic Purnodoirgho Prem Kahini (2013), action-thriller Shikari (2016), Nabab (2017), political-drama Rajneeti (2017), drama Swatta (2017), Bhaijaan Elo Re (2018), Chalbaaz (2018), supernatural-thiller Naqaab (2018), crime-action Password (2019) and socio-drama Bir (2020). In 2011, he made his debut as a playback singer in the film of Moner Jala. In 2014, he made his debut as a producer with the film Hero: The Superstar and subsequently produced films like Password (2019), Bir (2020) and upcoming Rajkumar, Maya and Priyotoma.....

Filmography

As actor

Special appearances

As singer

As producer

Television appearances

Footnotes

References

External links
 

Male actor filmographies
Bangladeshi filmographies